LYTO is an Indonesian online game publisher (LYTOGAME), and has been established in 2003. LYTO is one of the pioneer game publishing company in South East Asia with more than 30 million members across the region.

LYTO has published many variety of different MMO (Massive Multiplayer Online)  originating from Asia. The games as of today are  Ragnarok Online (Korea), Getamped (Japan), Seal Online (Korea), RF Online (Korea), Idol-Street, Perfect World (China), Atlantica Online, Luna Online and Crossfire (Korea).

On 2019, LYTO expanded its business as a Production House for filmmaking (LYTO PICTURES).

LYTO also often holds various events. One of them is held every year, called “LYTO  Game Festival”. LYTO Game Festival usually contains game competitions, gatherings, and cosplay, while promoting their own game products. Lyto Game Festival usually attended by thousand gamers from all over Indonesia.

LYTO has a showroom called the Game-On Center for Lyto users to gather and ask for support on the game, much like a forum. Lyto has established many centers throughout Jakarta.

Published online game

 Crossfire
 RF Online
 Perfect World
 Idol-Street
 Rohan: Blood Feud
 Atlantica Online
 Luna Online
 Seal Online
 Maple Story
 Requiem Online
 Avalon Online
 Granado Espada
 Avatar Land
 Getamped-R
 Crazy Kart
 Allods Online
 Jade Dynasty
 Forsaken World
 S4 League
 Fiesta Evolution
 Phantomers
Juragan Ojek
 Kingdoms: Iron & Blood
 Angel Squad Mobile
 Faunia Paw
 Fantasia Heroes
 Robowar Android
 Pixel Super Heroes
 Enneas Saga
 Kafe Impian

Published MOVIE & Film

 DreadOut Movie (2019)
 Pamali Movie (2022)

References

External links
 Lytogame.com
 Lyto.net
 LytoPictures.com

Companies based in Jakarta
Video game companies established in 2003
Video game publishers
Video game companies of Indonesia
Indonesian companies established in 2003